Gaskins may refer to:

 Gaskins (surname)
 Gaskins Run
 Gaskins, Arkansas
 Gaskins, Florida
 Gaskins, Isle of Wight

See also
 Gaskin (disambiguation)